This is a list of the governors of the province of Panjshir, Afghanistan.

Governors of Panjshir Province

See also
 List of current governors of Afghanistan

Notes

Panjshir